Westel Willoughby (April 3, 1830 – December 21, 1897) was an American lawyer and soldier, who briefly served on the Virginia Supreme Court during Congressional Reconstruction, and unsuccessfully ran for statewide office several times.

Early and family life

Westel Willoughby was born on April 3, 1830 in Groton, Tompkins County, New York to Franklin Bakus Willoughby and his wife Keziah Slosson Delano. He attended schools in Groton and Homer, in Cortland County, then attended Hamilton College. He taught and worked as a carpenter to support himself during those studies and graduated in 1854. Then he studied law while teaching at academies in Aurora and Moravia, both in nearby Cayuga County.

On May 10, 1859, Willoughy married schoolteacher Jennie Rebecca Woodbury in Groton. They would have twin sons Westel Woodbury Willoughby (1867-1945) and William F. Willoughby (1867-1960) and a daughter. Mr. and Mrs. Willoughby would be active in the Presbyterian Church, and Willoughby in YMCA, and their sons both became prominent academics and public administrators.

Career

Willoughby was admitted to the New York bar at Oswego. He then began his private legal practice back home in Groton.

American Civil War

During the American Civil War, Willoughby helped recruit soldiers for the 137th New York Volunteer Regiment, and received an officer's commission on November 1, 1862. At the Battle of Chancellorsville on May 3, 1863, he was severely wounded in an artillery barrage. Willoughby recovered enough for release from the hospital, but resigned his commission due to his injuries in September.

Virginia prosecutor, judge and politician
Willoughby remained in Union-occupied Alexandria, Virginia and was admitted to the Virginia bar. In 1864, he won election and on July 5, 1864 assumed office as Alexandria's Commonwealth Attorney (a/k/a prosecutor, including for the portions which later became Arlington County). In May 1866, local judge H. W. Thomas refused to allow an African American woman to testify as a witness against a white man, citing an old state law. Willoughby appealed to the federal court and secured an indictment against Judge Thomas (who had reportedly years earlier barred the Fairfax courthouse doors to intimidate Unionist voters) for violating the witness' civil rights. Willoughby also allowed African Americans to sit on juries. Furthermore, he and his wife were among the initial organizers of the Virginia State Women Suffrage Association.

During Congressional Reconstruction, Major General John Schofield dismissed Judge Thomas and other judges pursuant to a new federal statute which forbade all former Confederates from holding state offices. Willoughby was appointed to replace Judge Thomas on March 22, 1869, as judge of the Ninth Circuit, which encompassed Alexandria, Fairfax, Fauquier, Loudoun, Prince William, Rappahannock, and Stafford counties. On June 3, Schofield dismissed all three member of the Court of Appeals of Virginia (which later became the Virginia Supreme Court) due to that new law. Schofield appointed Willoughby and two other former Union Officers to that body. When the new Virginia Constitution of 1869 was adopted, he was allowed to remain in office until the General Assembly reorganized the state judiciary. The Court on which he sat met June 22 to 28, and on October 12, 1869, and finally from January 11 to February 25, 1870. Judge Willoughby wrote 6 of the 8 opinions it issued.

Willoughby then became a director of the Virginia Peat Company and also resumed his private legal practice in Alexandria. In 1871 he became the Republican candidate for state senate, but lost. Later that year he and Charles Whittlesey formed a partnership which specializing in seeking reimbursement from the recently created Southern Claims Commission for Union supporters. The federal government also hired the firm to defend seizures of property from Confederate supporters, including Arlington House, previously owned by Washington descendant George Washington Custis Lee, whose daughter married Confederate General Robert E. Lee, and which had become Arlington National Cemetery. Willoughby also ran to become a member of Alexandria's city council in 1873 as a Radical Republican, and lost.

Willoughby became a director of the East Fairmont Gas, Coal and Coke Company of West Virginia in 1876. He was nominated again in 1881 as Republican nominee for Attorney General but withdrew from consideration. In 1884, he campaigned for Republican Presidential candidate James G. Blaine, who lost.

Later legal practice
He had previously conducted some of his legal practice across the Potomac River in Washington, D.C. He moved there in 1887. Willoughby also taught real property law in 1889 and 1890 at the National University Law School (that later became part of George Washington University). In 1884 he became vice president of the Arlington-Breckenridge Mining Company, and in 1897 president of the Columbia Dredging and Construction Company.

Death and legacy
Westel Willoughby died at his home in Washington, D.C. on December 21, 1897, and was returned across the Potomac River and buried at Arlington National Cemetery two days later.

References

1830 births
1897 deaths
Justices of the Supreme Court of Virginia
Virginia lawyers
Virginia state court judges
Lawyers from Washington, D.C.
Hamilton College (New York) alumni
Politicians from Alexandria, Virginia
People of Virginia in the American Civil War
Lawyers from Alexandria, Virginia
19th-century American judges
19th-century American lawyers